The United States sent a delegation to compete at the 1988 Summer Paralympics in Seoul, South Korea.  Its athletes finished first in the gold and overall medal count.

See also 
 1988 Summer Paralympics
 United States at the 1988 Summer Olympics

References

External links
International Paralympic Committee Official Website
United States Paralympic Committee Official Website

Nations at the 1988 Summer Paralympics
1988
Paralympics